Markazi, meaning "Central", may refer to:

Markazi Province, Iran
Markazi Rural District, Bushehr Province, Iran
Markazi Masjid, Dewsbury, England
Arash Markazi, Iranian-American sports journalist